The 1957–58 Honduran Amateur League was the tenth edition of the Honduran Amateur League.  Club Deportivo Olimpia obtained its 1st national title.  The season ran from 17 February 1957 to 16 February 1958.

Regional champions

Known results

National championship round
Played in a double round-robin format between the regional champions.  Also known as the Cuadrangular.

Known results

Olimpia's lineup

References

Liga Amateur de Honduras seasons
Honduras
1957 in Honduras
1958 in Honduras